Gustavo Pedroso Zamaio (born 7 April 1986) is a retired Brazilian footballer.

Career statistics

Club

Notes

References

1986 births
Living people
Brazilian footballers
Brazilian expatriate footballers
Association football midfielders
Sociedade Esportiva Palmeiras players
Toledo Esporte Clube players
União Bandeirante Futebol Clube players
Bidvest Wits F.C. players
Brazilian expatriate sportspeople in South Africa
Expatriate soccer players in South Africa
Footballers from São Paulo